Hypostomus carinatus is a species of catfish in the family Loricariidae. It is native to South America, where it occurs in the middle Amazon River basin. The species reaches 24.8 cm (9.8 inches) SL and is believed to be a facultative air-breather.

H. carinatus appears in the aquarium trade, where it is usually referred to either as the blackspotted orange pleco or by its associated L-number, which is L-166.

References 

Fish described in 1881
Hypostominae